The House of Glass is a 1918 American silent drama film directed by Émile Chautard and starring Clara Kimball Young, Pell Trenton, and Corliss Giles.

Cast

References

Bibliography
 Goble, Alan. The Complete Index to Literary Sources in Film. Walter de Gruyter, 1999.

External links

1918 films
1918 drama films
1910s English-language films
American silent feature films
Silent American drama films
American black-and-white films
Selznick Pictures films
Films directed by Emile Chautard
1910s American films